Jacob Berner may refer to:

Jacob Berner (politician) (1865–1931), American politician
Jacob Berner (footballer) (1900–1941), Norwegian footballer